Benedikt Ledebur is a poet, essayist and critic based in Vienna, Austria.

Life and work 

Ledebur was editor of two issues of Der Ficker – a homage to the bimonthly  of  – in 2005 and 2006. They were published on the occasion of exhibitions in Austria and Belgium showing among other Franz West, Clegg & Guttmann, Rudolf Polanszky and Tamuna Sirbiladze. Ledebur was the partner of Sirbiladze during her last years until her death 2016.

Publications 

 Poetisches Opfer,, Ritter Verlag, Klagenfurt/Vienna 1998.
 ÜBER/TRANS/LATE/SPÄT, Onestarpress, Paris 2001.
 Nach John Donne,, Der Pudel, Vienna 2004.
 Genese,, Onomato, Edition Schwarzes Quadrat, Düsseldorf 2008.
 Montaigne: Versuche der Selbstauflösung,, Klever Verlag, Vienna 2010.
 Kuburebi/Baukasten,, Poems and essays, translated into Georgian, Dato Barbakadse (Ed.), Mertskuli-Verlag, Tbilisi 2011.
 Ein Fall für die Philosophie: Über Dichtung, Rhetorik und Mathematik,, Klever Verlag, Vienna 2014.
 Das Paradox des Realen. Essays zur Kunst,, Schlebrügge.Editor, Vienna 2015.
 karis ciskwili/Windmühle - A wreath of sonnets for Tamuna Sirbiladze, translated into Georgian by Lulu Dadiani, Tbilisi 2017.

Cooperations 

 Zwischen den Zeilen, Volume 22, Urs Engeler (Editor), John Donne - Translations Engeler-Verlag, Zurich 2003.
 Zwischen den Zeilen, Volume 23, Theresia Prammer (Editor), Ein Gedicht und seine Nachbilder. Zu Übersetzungen von Giacomo Leopardis l´infinito, Engeler-Verlag, Zurich 2004.
 Zu einer Semiologie der Sinne, Rudolf Polanszky, Onestarpress, Paris 2005.
 Der Ficker No. 1, Benedikt Ledebur (Editor), Schlebrügge Editor, Vienna 2005.
 Wolfenbütteler Übersetzergespräche IV - VI, Olaf Kutzmutz & Adrian La Salvia (Editor), Translation: Shadowtime / Schattenzeit, by Charles Bernstein, Bundesakademie für kulturelle Bildung, Wolfenbüttel 2006.
 Der Ficker No. 2, Benedikt Ledebur (Editor), Schlebrügge.Editor, Vienna 2006.
Displacement and Condensation, Franz West, The Form of Enjoyment: Fragrances Obsessed by Herb, or the Sneeze in Art, Gagosian Gallery, London 2006.
Aphatischer Muse Rede, Eulogy on Brigitta Falkner, Vienna 2007.
Das Kosmöschen in chaotischer Auslese, zu Dominik Steigers Ausstellung Kosmöschen Steiger in the gallery Hohenlohe & Kalb, Vienna 2008.
 Bildsatz, Franz Josef Czernin, Martin Janda (Editors), on Werner Feiersinger, Du Mont Buchverlag, Cologne 2008.
 Nichts tun, Oswald Egger (Editor), Zum Verhältnis von Dichtung und Mathematik, Das böhmische Dorf, Neuss-Holzheim 2009.
The Paradox of the Real in Art in Hyper Real - The Passion of the Real in Painting and Photography  Walther König, Cologne 2010.
4 Schnellgedichte und 6 Schnellzeichnungen, in: KLEINE AXT, Ulf Stolterfoht (Editor), www.kleineaxt.wordpress.com, 1. November 2010.
Ethik, Geld, Politik und Poetik - Fragen zum Fall Ezra Pounds, dem Dichter der Pisan Cantos, in: TIMBER! Eine kollektive Poetologie, Ulf Stolterfoht (Editor), www.timberpoetologie.wordpress.com, 27. Februar 2011.
 Extroversion - A Talk, with Franz West, Schlebrügge.Editor, Vienna 2011.
Dieter Roths weißes Blatt Gedichte, kalmenzone literary magazine, No. 7,  www.kalmenzone.de, Cornelius van Alsum (Ed.), April 2015.
 Proof, Michael Huey, Peter Bogner (Ed.), Friedrich Kiesler Foundation, Vienna 2015.
 Translinear Structures, Rudolf Polanszky, Andrea Schantl (Ed.), The Poetic Character of the Meaningless, Kerber Verlag, Bielefeld 2015.
 Tamuna Sirbiladze - Eve's apple, in memory, curated by Benedikt Ledebur, Charim Galerie, Vienna 2016.
 Two Paintings by Michaela Eichwald at the Group Exhibition "The Unknown Masterpiece" and a Further Balzac Book Title and The Power of Women and the Freedom in Collages - Franz Wests Designs in Das unbekannte Meisterwerk / The Unknown Masterpiece, Christian Meyer (Hg./ed.), Schlebrügge.Editor, Wien 2017
  Gestalt und Prozess, in Zeitschrift für Kulturphilosophie 2017|1, Ralf Konersmann, Dirk Westerkamp (Editors), Felix Meiner Verlag, Hamburg 2017.
 Gedenken und Ästhetik - Reflexionen und Lektüre zur Ausstellung "Der Sand aus den Uhren" samt trauriger Exkursion in die eigene Familiengeschichte, in Der Sand aus den Uhren, Benjamin A. Kaufmann (Ed.), Passagen Verlag, Vienna 2017.
 Tamuna Sirbiladze,, Benedikt Ledebur, Lucas Zwirner (Editors), David Zwirner Books, New York 2017.
 Max Henry 1820, curated by Benedikt Ledebur, Charim Galerie, Vienna 2018.
 The act of reclining / L'acte de s'allonger, in: Franz West, p. 186 , Mark Godfrey & Christine Macel (Editors), Paris, London 2018.
 On the Song and Language of Animals - An etude from memory on Franz West's Otium, in: Otium - Franz West, Booklet  , Astrid Ihle (Editor), Heimo Zobernig (Concept), Koenig Books Ltd, London 2018.

Awards 
2015: Art Critics Award

References

Living people
Austrian male poets
Austrian art critics
Translators to German
Austrian curators
Austrian translators
Austrian philosophers
Year of birth missing (living people)